Golikov is a Russian masculine surname, its feminine counterpart is Golikova. It may refer to

 Aleksandr Golikov (born 1952), Russian-Soviet ice hockey player
  (1931—2010), Russian malacologist
 Angelina Golikova (born 1991), Russian speed skater
 Arkady Gaidar, pen name of Soviet writer Arkady Golikov (1904–1941)
 Filipp Golikov (1900–1980), Russian-Soviet military commander
 Mikhail Golikov (born 1969), Russian football player
 Tatyana Golikova (born 1966), Russian economist
 Vladimir Golikov (born 1954), Russian-Soviet ice hockey player

Russian-language surnames